Abdirahim Hussein Mohamed (born 21 October 1978 in Somalia) is a Somalian-born Finnish media personality and a politician.

Biography
In 2007, Mohamed became the first immigrant to chair a political party organization in Finland when he was elected Chairman of the Helsinki Centre Youth. In June 2016, Mohamed left the Center Party, because of the budget cuts in education and development aid made by the Sipilä Cabinet. He subsequently joined the Social Democratic Party.

In 2015 he criticized Israel, claiming that Israel is systematically murdering Palestinian women, children, and the elderly.

In 2017 municipal elections, Mohamed was elected to the City Council of Helsinki.

In 2019 Mohamed apologised for making up a story about removing a passenger from his taxi after allegedly suffering racist abuse, stating, "I apologise for my actions and for lying. As a decision-maker, it is my duty to be honest. I depend on my voters’ trust and I have now broken that trust. I shall do everything I can to restore trust in my actions."

Mohamed is the Chairman of Moniheli, a co-operation network for multicultural organizations in the Helsinki capital region. He also has his own radio show on Finnish National Radio Yle.

References

1978 births
Living people
Somalian emigrants to Finland
Politicians from Helsinki
Centre Party (Finland) politicians
Social Democratic Party of Finland politicians